Ann Louise Gittleman is an American author and proponent of alternative medicine, especially fad diets. She regards herself as a nutritionist.  Gittleman has written more than two dozen books and is known for The Fat Flush Plan, a "detox" diet and exercise program that she developed into a series of books. Gittleman's ideas on health and nutrition are regarded as pseudoscience.

Education and career

In 2002, she was given a Ph.D. in holistic nutrition from Clayton College of Natural Health, an unaccredited and now defunct diploma mill.

In 1994, she was featured in an advertising campaign for Rejuvex, a dietary supplement for menopause symptoms that is not supported by scientific or clinical evidence.

Gittleman has written many books on alternative medical ideas for health and nutrition. Her books have appeared on popular television programs, including 20/20, Dr. Phil, Good Morning America, and The Early Show. She has been criticized for promoting incorrect notions about medicine, diet, and electromagnetic radiation.

Books

In 2001, she released her book The Fat Flush Plan, which became a New York Times best seller, reaching #14 on the "Hardcover Advice" list.

In May 2004, The Fat Flush Plan was described along with other low carbohydrate diets in a Time magazine story, The Skinny on Low Carbs.

Gittleman's books have been criticized as inconsistent with the best understanding of health and nutrition, and for presenting scientific research in a simplistic and one-sided manner. According to Healthline, Gittleman's Fat Flush Plan is a fad diet that uses "convoluted science and gimmicky logic to sell its products", and that the bulk of the plan should be skipped because "a two-week juice fast is never healthy."

Gittleman's suggestion to detoxify as part of the Fat Flush Plan has made her diet the subject of criticism from some nutritionists and medical doctors. Dr. Judith Stern, vice president of the American Obesity Society, has called the Fat Flush Plan "pseudoscience" that promises everything, but is "a fantasy".

Gittleman's 2010 book Zapped has been met with skepticism by reviewers who say the book incorporates non-scientific concepts to assert the danger of electromagnetic fields, and presents evidence in a biased manner.

Gittleman has written more than two dozen books advocating an alternative medicine approach to health and nutrition.

Select titles:

  ( New York Times bestseller)
 
 
 
 
 
  Top 10 Notable New Diet Books of 2010 by Time magazine

References

External links
 

1949 births
Living people
American women nutritionists
American nutritionists
Jewish American writers
American health and wellness writers
American women non-fiction writers
Alternative detoxification promoters
Pseudoscientific diet advocates
Teachers College, Columbia University alumni
21st-century American Jews
21st-century American women